This article contains a list of candidates of the 2012 Russian presidential election.

Registered candidates 

The following candidates were successfully registered by the CEC, candidates are listed in the order they appear on the ballot paper (alphabetical order in Russian):

Rejected candidates 

The following candidates were denied registration by the CEC:

Declared candidates who withdrew without registering
Many Russian politicians publicly declared their intention to run for president in 2012, but failed to submit their nominations:

Ivan Okhlobystin, actor. On September 5, 2011 Okhlobystin announced his intention to participate in the election. He intended to run as the candidate of the "Sky Coalition". However, he clarified shortly after this that he would participate only if the Holy Synod of the Russian Orthodox Church granted him permission to run.  The Russian Orthodox Church ultimately opposed Okhlobystin's participation in the presidential election and quickly abandoned his plans to run.

Possible candidates who did not run
The following individuals were included in some polls, were referred to in the media as possible candidates or had publicly expressed interest long before the elections but never announced that they would run.
Dmitry Medvedev

Additionally:
In December 2010, the Party of People’s Freedom was created with the goal of creating a Russia rid of corruption.  At the party's summer 2011 congress it was intended for a single candidate for the presidency of Russia  to be nominated by the party to represent the liberal opposition. However, after the party's registration was refused, the party congress in September 2011 signaled that it would not put forth a nominee, declaring that, “The existing procedure for nominating independent candidates to participate in the election of the President of the Russian Federation is in fact prohibitive and deprives the Party of opportunities to participate in them”.
On December 15, 2010, the leader of the Movement in Defense of the Khimki Forest, Evgenia Chirikova, told Gazeta.ru that in 2012 the movement would nominate its candidate for the presidency of Russia. On December 18, 2011, at the Yabloko party congress, Yevgenia Chirikova suggested that the party nominate Alexei Navalny to the presidency, but this suggestion was refused due to the lack of written consent by Navalny to the nomination (Navalny was under administrative arrest at that time).

References

 
2012